Susan Morrice (born 1952) is a geologist, explorer, and entrepreneur located in Denver. She is a long time promoter of "cult-like" Educo. She received a MoD degree in geology from Trinity College Dublin. She is the first woman/person to have found oil in commercial quantities in Belize and is one of the founding members of BNE (Belize Natural Energy). Later on she started XJet Worldwide.

Early life 
She was born and raised in Belfast, Northern Ireland and is the elder sister of Jane Morrice. She currently resides in Denver and has two daughters, Hannah and Clare. Her interest in geology stems from her childhood memories. "My attraction to geology was nature. As a young girl in Ireland, dashing about the rocks, playing in the waves... I was just fascinated."  As a child, she visited popular geological sites with her family, which made her develop a passion for rocks and soils. She later decided to pursue a career in Geology when she learned it was a profession. She recalls thinking, “I’m going to do that”. During her post secondary education, the movement of tectonic plates was an emerging study. She later learned how the Geology industry works when she started traveling around the world for an American-Canadian stratigraphic. By discovering the world and the industry, she developed a strong interest in mapping and the geological aspects of new areas like farmlands.

Education 
Susan attended grammar school at Ashleigh School, which is now called Hunterhouse College. She was one of four women during her first year who studied Natural Sciences at Trinity College in Dublin, and later specialized in geology.  Susan graduated in 1976 with a Bachelor of Arts (honors) in Natural Science/Geology. During her time of education, continental drift was becoming a more accepted theory. The geological world was evolving and changing due to new concepts coming to life and becoming more relevant. Susan pointed out, “geology was really evolving."  Unfortunately, Susan had failed her first year of college. Through a recommendation and push from her Geology professor, she was given the chance to redo her first year. Due to financial burden of post- secondary she got a job at Captain Americas (restaurant) while redoing her first year. Through experience from Captain Americas, Susan attributes that success comes from hard work.

Career 
After graduating from Trinity College, Morrice began working for American-Canadian Stratigraphic where she was given the opportunity to travel the world surveying and networking with other geologists in the industry. When talking about this time of her life, she recalls how “the concept of plate tectonics was just taking hold, [geology] is a science where you can keep asking questions, and I loved being a part of the process”. She joined Knight Royalty as a frontier geologist. This job included mapping and more community-based interactions. In 1982, she left Knight Royalty and started her own company, S. Morrice and Associates, LLC. In the early 1990s, the American Association of Petroleum Geologists (AAPG) asked her and Roger Slatt to head the international convention of the AAPG. This led to the birth of the International Pavilion which gives a platform for oil companies to access new contracts in different countries. She founded Belize Natural Energy (BNE) with Mike Usher in 1991 and located their first oil well in a sandstone reservoir. In the mid-2000's she started another company, XJet Worldwide. She is currently the chairwoman of BNE and CHx Capital, a private investment firm.

Belize Natural Energy (BNE) 

As a young geologist, Morrice was invited to go to Belize to look into the oil potential. Although she was seeking for new job opportunities, she enjoyed working with everyone in Belize and knew there was a good chance in finding oil in Belize. She and a Belizean man, Mike Usher, explored for many years shooting seismic and by drilling but were unsuccessful. Morrice spent four years researching and found a seminar presented by Tony Quinn that she felt could help her learn more. She attended a 12-day Educo Seminar in 2002. Immediately after that, she went to Belize to set up BNE. Soon after trying to start this in Belize, she realized that it was a difficult sell as there were 50 dry holes. Together, Usher and Morrice went to Ireland to talk to others who took the Educo course and were willing to help in Belize. After receiving funding, for the drilling, from Irish investors, Usher abruptly became ill and passed away in June 2004. They only had enough income for two wells, and in 2005 the first well was a success and was named it "Mike Usher #1". After the success of the first well, they drilled five more wells which were all successful and carried on to build BNE. Since starting the company, BNE has drilled more than 62 wells, producing over 10 million barrels of oil.

International Natural Energy (INE) was created to hold shares in BNE. International Natural Energy was founded by Shelia McCaffrey, Paul Marriott, Jean Cornec, Mike Usher and Morrice. Usher died a year before oil was struck in Belize.
Morrice was named as defendant with 3 cases brought by 3 of the remaining living co-founders of INE.

In January 2011 Tony Quinn was ordered by the Eastern Caribbean Supreme Court to purchase Marriott's shares in INE and found in breach of his fiduciary duties to INE in a case against Quinn, Morrice and INE. Quinn was ordered to pay costs for the action. Marriott expressed a hope INE would dissociate with Quinn and recover damages by him against shareholders.

In January 2012 Quinn was compelled by Mr Justice Patrick McCarthy of the Irish High Court to give video evidence in a case in the United States District Court for the District of Colorado brought by Cornec who claimed to not be paid fully the amount of $15 million for the sale of shares in INE to Morrice. Morrice counterclaimed that Cornec broke his contract with a campaign of disparagement against Quinn resulting in the loss of a $100 million investment from Dubai.

In July 2012 Mr Justice Gerard Hogan ordered Sunday World journalist Nicola Tallant and Dialogue Ireland director Mike Garde to appear in United States District Court for the District of Colorado to give evidence in the case and adjourned for a month to allow them to apply the orders to be set aside. The court heard how both were "party to communications relevant to the Colorado proceedings." It was claimed Tallant could be urged to reveal the sources for her stories.

Later in September 2012 the Irish High Court ruled that Nicola Tallant and Mike Garde did not have to give evidence. Mr Justice Gerard Hogan set aside orders saying "if, as she maintains, Mr Quinn holds unorthodox religious views and is effectively the leader of a religious cult which has used psychological techniques as a means of controlling gullible adherents, the media are entitled to educate public opinion in this regard."

In July 2012 Mr Justice Bannister declined to dissolve INE or to order the company to purchase McCaffrey's shares, but granted a declaration that Quinn's appointment to the INE board was invalid and that McCaffrey's suspension from the INE board was invalid. In discussing the hiring of soldiers the judge said "Whatever may have been the need for some personal security, the expenditure was made in very large part for the purposes of Mr Quinn, who appears to have hired what amounted to a private army at the sole expense of INE".

In 2012 Sunday World revealed McCaffrey had been included in an intelligence-report paid for by INE and produced by Henrima Ltd.

Mr Justice Bannister described Quinn as "a highly controversial figure both in the Republic of Ireland and further afield. He runs what he calls Educo seminars, which people are persuaded to attend at very high cost." He described Quinn's unique business structure as "no more than advice to promote better employees in preference to inferior ones". A letter alleged to invite Quinn to accept a shareholding was described by the judge as a "clumsy forgery" and an "after-the-event concoction written in an unsuccessful attempt to legitimise the allotment".

In October 2012 a BBC Spotlight programme on the subject of Morrice and her involvement with Tony Quinn was broadcast. In February 2014 Charles Colville, 5th Viscount Colville of Culross spoke in the House of Lords about the harassment endured by the team behind the programme, with hourly phone calls with threats of defamation and how after broadcast a libel writ issued was dropped after thousands of licence-fee payer funds were paid preparing a defence. Colville added "Morrice [was] found guilty in a Caribbean court of having siphoned off thousands of pounds of company money for her personal use."

Educo 
Morrice is known to promote the Educo Seminar and the discredited Educo Model and recruit for the group, which has been described as Cult-like.

In the June 2018 edition of the American Association of Petroleum Geologists' "Explorer" magazine Morrice states she sent Elsia Pop, winner of the Diana Award in 2017, to the Educo Seminar.

Between October and December 2018 Morrice was decorated with the role of "GEM Executive in Residence" by the University of Colorado Denver which also mentioned the discredited Educo Model on its own website.

At the Society of Exploration Geophysicists 2019 Annual Meeting Morrice featured on a Permian Basin Experience Podcast where she claimed BNE was founded on the philosophy of Educo.

The Rotary Club of Melbourne hosted a Zoom event featuring Morrice in November 2020 where she spoke about the Educo Seminar. The Melbourne Rotary Club promoted the event on its own website with a link to Educo's own website.

In April 2021 Morrice appeared on the Society of Exploration Geophysicists "EVOLVE" YouTube channel where she talked about the Educo Seminar and made claims about its influence in Belize. Morrice stated that Mayor of Belmopan Khalid Belisle attended Educogym and that Chief Of Police Howell Gillett had halved crime in Belmopan upon returning from the Educo Seminar. 

On 15 March 2022 Morrice addressed the Caribbean Oil and Gas Virtual Summit and made claims that the use of Educo in Belize was being utilised by the Prison System and in Crime Prevention.

Awards and achievements 

 Morrice was the first woman to ever receive the Norman Foster Outstanding Explorer award by the AAPG.
 Morrice and BNE won the GetEnergy award, beating 43 other countries.
 Morrice was awarded the AAPG Presidential Award for Exemplary service in recognition of her work in geoscience.
 Morrice received the 2018 Outstanding explorer award.

References 

Living people
1952 births
Date of birth missing (living people)
Businesspeople from Belfast
British women geologists
Alumni of Trinity College Dublin
Petroleum geologists
Belizean businesspeople
British women company founders
Businesspeople in the oil industry